The Cameroon national women's cricket team is the team that represents Cameroon in international women's cricket. In April 2018, the International Cricket Council (ICC) granted full Women's Twenty20 International (WT20I) status to all its members. Therefore, all Twenty20 matches played between Cameroon women and other ICC members since 1 July 2018 have been full WT20I matches.

In December 2020, the ICC announced the qualification pathway for the 2023 ICC Women's T20 World Cup. The Cameroon women's team made their debut at an ICC women's event, when they played in the 2021 ICC Women's T20 World Cup Africa Qualifier group.

Records and statistics

International Match Summary — Cameroon Women
 
Last updated 15 September 2021

Twenty20 International

T20I record versus other nations

Records complete to WT20I #970. Last updated 15 September 2021.

See also
 List of Cameroon women Twenty20 International cricketers

References

 
Women's
Women's national cricket teams